Fishcross is a small village in Clackmannanshire in central Scotland, situated to the north of Sauchie at a crossroads just south of Tillicoultry. Formerly a mining village, the population is 484 as at 2003.

A golf course and equestrian centre are located nearby and at Auchinbaird there is a fine example of a windmill built in the early 18th Century to drain a coal pit   and later converted to serve as a dovecote.

References

External links

 

Villages in Clackmannanshire